Events in the year 1838 in Norway.

Incumbents
Monarch: Charles III John

Events
1 January – Fulfilling a law from 1837 all parishes form the bases for the establishment of altogether 396 formannskapsdistrikts, the precursor of municipalities.

Arts and literature

Births

10 January – Johan Christopher Brun, pharmacist and politician (d.1914)
12 March – Johan Gerhard Theodor Ameln, politician (d.1917)
23 March – Johan Christian Heuch, bishop and politician (d.1904)
28 December – Albert Marius Jacobsen, military officer and politician (d.1909)
31 December – Jacob Aall Bonnevie, politician and Minister (d.1904)

Full date unknown
Ludvig Aubert, politician and Minister (d.1896)
Edvard Hans Hoff, politician and Minister (d.1933)
Christian Johansen Ihlen, politician
Ole C. Johnson, soldier in the American Civil War (d.1886)
Anders Nicolai Kiær, statistician (d.1919)
Christian Homann Schweigaard, politician and Prime Minister (d.1899)

Deaths

10 March – Jonas Greger Walnum, politician (b.1771)
27 June - Nils Christian Frederik Hals, military officer (b.1758)
20 November - Syvert Amundsen Eeg, farmer and politician (b.1757)
29 December – Søren Christian Sommerfelt, priest and botanist (b. 1794).

See also

References